Double or Nothing is a collaborative studio album by American rapper Big Sean and American record producer Metro Boomin. The album was released on December 8, 2017, by GOOD Music, Def Jam Recordings, Republic Records, Universal Music Group and Boominati Worldwide. It features guest appearances from Travis Scott, 2 Chainz, 21 Savage, Kash Doll, Young Thug, and Swae Lee. The album's production was handled primarily by Metro Boomin, alongside Earlly Mac, Pi'erre Bourne and Southside.

The album was supported by two singles: "Pull Up N Wreck" featuring 21 Savage and "So Good" featuring Kash Doll.

Background
In an interview with Billboard published on December 1, 2017, Big Sean announced the collaborative album. The two previously worked on Sean's previous studio album, I Decided (2017), on the single "Bounce Back" and album tracks "Sacrifices" and "Voices in My Head / Stick to the Plan". The album art and release date was announced on December 6, 2017, while the track listing was announced via social media the following day, the day before release.

The intro song, "Go Legend" featuring Travis Scott, was previewed by Sean at Lollapalooza 2017 in Chicago. The song originally was thought to have Offset as an additional feature but did not make the studio version of the song.

Songs from the album were previewed by American athlete LeBron James via Instagram the day before release.

Singles
The lead single, "Pull Up N Wreck" featuring 21 Savage, was released on November 3, 2017 for streaming and digital download. "So Good" featuring Kash Doll was sent to rhythmic radio on February 13, 2018 as the album's second single.

Critical reception

Double or Nothing received mixed reviews from critics upon release, with a general criticism of the collaborative pairing. At Metacritic, which assigns a normalized rating out of 100 to reviews from mainstream publications, the album received an average score of 54, based on 4 reviews. Claire Lobenfeld of Pitchfork criticised the album's lyricism, stating that "Though fun and at times politically salient, even Metro Boomin cannot rescue Big Sean from his habit of writing the absolute corniest lyrics imaginable." Chase McMullen of The 405 commented that "There's no denying Big Sean has had more staying power in hip hop than some might have expected, but for Metro Boomin, who's largely been wise in choosing fresh faces on equal creative footing for his full length projects, Double or Nothing is a dull misstep." In another mixed review, Trent Clark of HipHopDX concluded: "While the essential purpose of the album is never specified, Sean spends a ridiculous amount of time skeeting on tracks with no filter on the filler."

Online music publication Sputnikmusic stated Double or Nothing is "ostensibly 10 bangers processed through Metro’s lean, gothic synths and Sean’s plain-spoken statements of wealth and general overconfidence. It’s boring stuff." 

Joshua Robinson from hnhh stated than the album "demonstrated the next step in Big Sean’s growth“ and singled songs like “Who’s Stopping Me“ and the off-kilter “Even The Odds“ and concludes with the statement: “Love it or hate it, Double or Nothing had plenty of highlights.“

Despite the reviews, Big Sean is very fond of the album and enjoyed his collaboration with Metro Boomin and said the album was just « straight fun ».

In 2022, Metro Boomin admits that he felt some creative malaise in 2017, and that the negative reaction to the album rattled him a bit:“I still do like the album and I’m not gonna get into how people try to do Big Sean or treat him online, which I know played a big part of it. I know a lot of those songs or a lot of the shit that he said, if another huge rapper or rappers similar to him said it, they would just let it slide.”

Commercial performance
Double or Nothing debuted at number six on the US Billboard 200 and number two on the US Top R&B/Hip-Hop Albums chart, with 50,000 album-equivalent units, of which 10,000 were pure album sales in its first week of release.

Track listing
Credits adapted from Tidal.

Notes
 "Savage Time" features additional vocals from Travis Scott
 "Even the Odds" features additional vocals from Gucci Mane

Sample credits
 "Go Legend" contains samples from "Theme from Mahogany (Do You Know Where You're Going To)", performed by Diana Ross
 "Who's Stopping Me" contains samples from "Clarão da Lua", performed by Nazaré Pereira.
 "In Tune" contains samples from "Up Against the Wind", performed by Lori Perry.
 "No Hearts, No Love" contains samples from "Strawberry Letter 23", performed by The Brothers Johnson.

Personnel
Credits adapted from Tidal.

Performers
 Big Sean – primary artist, vocals, songwriting 
 Metro Boomin – primary artist, production, songwriting 
 Travis Scott – featured artist 
 2 Chainz – featured artist 
 21 Savage – featured artist 
 Kash Doll – featured artist 
 Young Thug – featured artist 
 Swae Lee – featured artist 

Musicians
 Chris Harrington – musical director 
 The Atlanta Boys Choir – choir 

Technical
 Gregg Rominiecki – recording 
 Maximilian Jaeger – recording 
 Kuldeep Chudasama – recording assistant 
 Jim Caruana – recording 
 Miguel Scott – recording assistant 
 Ethan Stevens – mixing , recording 
 Joe LaPorta – mastering 

Additional personnel
 Sarah Rountree – project manager
 Gunner Stahl – photography
 Jason Lee – cover photo
 Omar Rajput – art direction
 Mike Carson – creative director

Charts

Weekly charts

Year-end charts

References

2017 albums
Big Sean albums
Metro Boomin albums
Collaborative albums
GOOD Music albums
Republic Records albums
Universal Music Group albums
Albums produced by Metro Boomin
Albums produced by Southside (record producer)
Albums produced by Pi'erre Bourne